Cyclist is a British magazine that covers road cycling in the forms of professional racing news together with consumer guides and reviews.

History
The Cyclist magazine was founded in 2012, before launching a website in 2015.

Awards
 PPA for Best Specialist Consumer Magazine: 2015, 2016

See also

 Cycle Sport (magazine)
 Cycling Weekly
 Procycling
 Cycle Sport (magazine)

References

External links
 

Cycling magazines published in the United Kingdom
Monthly magazines published in the United Kingdom
English-language magazines
Magazines established in 2012
2012 establishments in the United Kingdom
Magazines published in London